Spree is a 2020 American satirical horror thriller film directed by Eugene Kotlyarenko. The gonzo-style satire follows a social media obsessed rideshare driver played by Joe Keery who, in an attempt to become viral, livestreams himself murdering passengers. The film also stars Sasheer Zamata, David Arquette, Kyle Mooney and Mischa Barton. It was executive-produced by Drake.

Spree premiered on January 24, 2020, at the 2020 Sundance Film Festival as part of the NEXT category, and was released theatrically and via video on demand in the United States on August 14, 2020, by RLJE Films. The film received mixed reviews, though critics praised Keery's performance and the film's premise.

Plot 
A young man named Kurt Kunkle is obsessed with being a social media star and becoming viral. A child he used to babysit, Bobby, is now an internet celebrity who frequently makes live streams and has high viewer numbers, making Kurt jealous. Kurt finds work as a driver for a rideshare app called Spree, then fits out his car with cameras and begins a new Livestream titled "The Lesson", where he instructs viewers on how to become famous on social media.

Kurt starts picking up passengers and killing them with poisoned bottles of water that he hands out in his car to gain attention. Despite this, he doesn't gain any viewers besides Bobby, who believes the killings are fake. One of the passengers  Kurt accepts is Jessie Adams, a comedian with a large social media following. Kurt is awestruck by Jessie, but she is unimpressed by Kurt and his obsession with gaining followers and leaves the ride. Kurt later learns that Jessie will be performing in a comedy show that will be live-streamed to millions. Kurt goes to Bobby's house, demanding that Bobby share Kurt's stream, but Bobby refuses and starts live streaming their argument, attracting a large audience. Kurt kills Bobby and takes his gun before live streaming for Bobby's fans, who assume the murder is fake.

Kurt's father Kris asks him for a ride to a club where he is performing, claiming that a famous DJ called uNo will be there and promising that the DJ will tag Kurt in a photo. When Kurt picks up Kris and takes him to the club, he approaches uNo; she initially refuses to tag him, but then asks him to take her to a taco truck with the promise of tagging him. While waiting for Kurt to get her some food from the truck, uNo discovers Bobby's gun and poses with it on a Livestream before drinking some of the poisoned water and passing out. After realizing this, Kurt attempts to drive away but is stopped by two police officers, who grow suspicious of him. It is revealed that Kurt's murders have already become known to the public, with Kurt being called "The Rideshare Killer" after police are unable to identify him.

uNo, having survived drinking the poisoned water, wakes up and panics, shooting dead one of the officers before fleeing, pursued by the second officer. Kurt tries to flee, but he too is pursued by more police, forcing him to escape while crashing his car through a homeless camp. With Kurt's murders becoming more well-known, Spree is temporarily shut down to allow an investigation to take place. Jessie begins her show, by performing a bit about her encounter with Kurt and how disgusted she is by people's desperation for social media fame before concluding her set by destroying her phone on stage, followed by a mic drop. Her actions cause her speech to go viral. After getting drunk, she is picked up by Kurt via another rideshare app called GoGo, with Kurt having killed the previous driver. Kurt gloats that as Jessie destroyed her phone on stage, she has no way of calling for help; she tries to escape after learning he is taking her to his house.

Unable to get out of the car, Jessie garrotes Kurt with a charger cable, causing them to crash, but Kurt recovers and beats Jessie unconscious. He arrives at his house and places Jessie's unconscious body outside before being requested by his now-eager viewers to kill Jessie. Distracted by a faulty camera, Kurt doesn't notice Jessie regaining consciousness. She manages to take control of the car and crashes into Kurt's house while trying to run him over. Kurt flees into the house while Jessie is confronted by an intoxicated Kris. The pair discover Kurt's dead mother, who had been killed by Kurt at the start of his Livestream. Kurt shoots his father dead and tries to kill Jessie, but she pins him to the wall with his car and beats him to death with a phone, takes a selfie with his dead body, and posts it on her Instagram account.

Jessie becomes a nationwide star after taking credit for disrupting Kurt's rampage, while Kurt and his killings become revered in small corners of the internet.

Cast

Production
Filming occurred in February 2019 around Los Angeles, California. Keery worked closely with Kotlyarenko to understand his character, and the pair filmed in-character social media posts such as unboxing videos, shopping trips and vape reviews. As research the cast also spent hours watching content from influencers on YouTube, Instagram and TikTok.

Release 
Spree premiered at the Sundance Film Festival on January 24, 2020. Shortly after, distributor RLJE Films paid $2 million to acquire the rights to the film. It was released in the United States in theaters and via VOD on August 14, 2020. It was released on DVD and Blu-ray on October 20, 2020. In late 2020 Spree was put onto Hulu. In May 2022, the film was made available on various platforms like Apple TV.

Reception

The website's critics consensus reads: "Joe Keery's magnetic screen presence can't disguise Sprees shallow critique of social media culture -- although that lack of depth may be precisely the point." Metacritic assigned the film a weighted average score of 41 out of 100, based on 14 critics, indicating "mixed or average reviews".

John DeFore of The Hollywood Reporter praised Keery's performance, saying: "Stranger Things sneakily charming Joe Keery gets the spotlight here, balancing the character's contradictory aspects (dork, fumbling people pleaser, psychopath) with ease" and "[to] the extent that it works, much credit goes to Keery, for finding the real human need inside this twentysomething cipher." Dan Jackson of Thrillist also praised Keery's performance, writing: "One of the best parts of Keery's performance is the way he plays the strange combination of naive earnestness and calculated cynicism that drives a person like Kurt to act in such a desperate manner, begging for followers and turning every awkward interaction into an opportunity to hawk his cringe-inducing brand."

Jessica Kiang of Variety gave the film a negative review, saying: "If you are in need of more reminders of the most extreme of the potential evils of internet interaction than you get every time you fire up an app, by all means, smash the like button on Spree. For the rest of us, the best advice might be to mute, block, vote down, unfollow or simply log off and go look at a tree."

References

External links
 

2020 films
2020 black comedy films
2020 comedy horror films
2020 independent films
2020s American films
2020s English-language films
American black comedy films
American comedy horror films
American independent films
Films about social media
Films set in 2019
Found footage films
Screenlife films